The  is an electric multiple unit (EMU) train type operated by the private railway operator Joshin Electric Railway on the Joshin Line in Gunma Prefecture, Japan, since December 2013.

Formation
, the company operates one two-car set, consisting of one motored ("Mc") car and one unpowered trailer ("Tc") car, and is formed as shown below.

The "Mc" car is fitted with two KP3274 single-arm pantographs.

Interior
Passenger accommodation consists of a mixture of transverse 4-person seating bays and longitudinal bench seating. The train does not have toilets.

History
The set entered service from December 2013.

References

Electric multiple units of Japan
Train-related introductions in 2013
Rail transport in Gunma Prefecture
Niigata Transys rolling stock
1500 V DC multiple units of Japan